Al-Qaeda is a Sunni pan-Islamist militant organization led by Salafi jihadists who self-identify as a vanguard spearheading a global Islamist revolution to unite the Muslim world under a supra-national Islamic state known as the Caliphate. Its members are mostly composed of Arabs, but also include other peoples. Al-Qaeda has mounted attacks on civilian and military targets in various countries, including the 1998 United States embassy bombings, the 2001 September 11 attacks, and the 2002 Bali bombings; it has been designated as a terrorist group by the United Nations Security Council, the North Atlantic Treaty Organization (NATO), the European Union, and various countries around the world.

The organization was founded in a series of meetings held in Peshawar during 1988, attended by Abdullah Azzam, Osama bin Laden, Muhammad Atef, Ayman al-Zawahiri and other veterans of the Soviet–Afghan War. Building upon the networks of Maktab al-Khidamat, the founding members decided to create an organization named "Al-Qaeda" to serve as a "vanguard" for jihad. Following the withdrawal of the Soviets in 1989, bin Laden offered mujahideen support to Saudi Arabia in the Gulf War in 1990–1991. His offer was rebuffed by the Saudi government, which instead sought the aid of the United States. The stationing of U.S. troops in Saudi Arabia prompted bin Laden to declare a jihad against the House of Saud, whom he condemned as takfir (apostates from Islam), and against the US. During 1992–1996, al-Qaeda established its headquarters in Sudan until it was expelled in 1996. It shifted its base to the Taliban-ruled Afghanistan and later expanded to other parts of the world, primarily in the Middle East and South Asia.

In 1996 and 1998, bin Laden issued two fatāwā calling for U.S. troops to leave Saudi Arabia. Al-Qaeda conducted the 1998 United States embassy bombings in Kenya and Tanzania, which killed 224 people. The U.S. retaliated by launching Operation Infinite Reach, against al-Qaeda targets in Afghanistan and Sudan. In 2001, al-Qaeda carried out the September 11 attacks, resulting in nearly 3,000 fatalities, substantial long-term health consequences and damaging global economic markets. The U.S. launched the war on terror in response and invaded Afghanistan to depose the Taliban and destroy al-Qaeda. In 2003, a U.S.-led coalition invaded Iraq, overthrowing the Ba'athist regime which it
wrongly accused of having ties with al-Qaeda. In 2004, al-Qaeda launched its Iraqi regional branch. After pursuing him for almost a decade, the U.S. military killed bin Laden in Pakistan in May 2011.

Al-Qaeda members believe a Judeo-Christian alliance (led by the United States) is conspiring to be at war against Islam and destroy Islam. As Salafist jihadists, members of Al-Qaeda believe that killing non-combatants is religiously sanctioned. Al-Qaeda also opposes what it regards as man-made laws, and wants to replace them exclusively with a strict form of sharīʿa (Islamic religious law, which is perceived as divine law). It characteristically organizes attacks such as suicide attacks and simultaneous bombing of several targets. Al-Qaeda's Iraq branch, which later morphed into the Islamic State of Iraq and Levant, was responsible for numerous sectarian attacks against Shias during its Iraqi insurgency. Al-Qaeda ideologues envision the violent removal of all foreign and secular influences in Muslim countries, which it denounces as corrupt deviations. Following the death of bin Laden in 2011, Al-Qaeda vowed to avenge his killing. The group was then led by Egyptian Ayman al-Zawahiri until his death in 2022. , it has reportedly suffered from a deterioration of central command over its regional operations.

Organization 
Al-Qaeda only indirectly controls its day-to-day operations. Its philosophy calls for the centralization of decision making, while allowing for the decentralization of execution. The top leaders of Al-Qaeda have defined the organization's ideology and guiding strategy, and they have also articulated simple and easy-to-receive messages. At the same time, mid-level organizations were given autonomy, but they had to consult with top management before large-scale attacks and assassinations. Top management included the shura council as well as committees on military operations, finance, and information sharing. Through the information committees of Al-Qaeda, he placed special emphasis on communicating with his groups. However, after the War on Terror, Al-Qaeda's leadership has become isolated. As a result, the leadership has become decentralized, and the organization has become regionalized into several Al-Qaeda groups.

Many terrorism experts do not believe that the global jihadist movement is driven at every level by Al-Qaeda's leadership. However, bin Laden held considerable ideological sway over some Muslim extremists before his death. Experts argue that Al-Qaeda has fragmented into a number of disparate regional movements, and that these groups bear little connection with one another.

This view mirrors the account given by Osama bin Laden in his October 2001 interview with Tayseer Allouni:

 however, Bruce Hoffman saw Al-Qaeda as a cohesive network that was strongly led from the Pakistani tribal areas.

Affiliates 
Al-Qaeda has the following direct affiliates:

 Al-Qaeda in the Arabian Peninsula (AQAP)
 Al-Qaeda in the Indian Subcontinent (AQIS)
 Al-Qaeda in the Islamic Maghreb (AQIM)
 al-Shabaab
 Jama'at Nasr al-Islam wal Muslimin (JNIM)
 Al-Qaeda in Bosnia and Herzegovina
 Imam Shamil Battalion
 Tawhid al-Jihad (Gaza Strip)
 Kurdistan Brigades
 Abu Hafs al-Masri Brigades
 Tanzim Qaedat al-Jihad
 Al-Qaeda in the Sinai Peninsula
 Hurras al-Din

The following are presently believed to be indirect affiliates of Al-Qaeda:

 Caucasus Emirate (factions)
 Fatah al-Islam
 Islamic Jihad Union
 Islamic Movement of Uzbekistan
 Jaish-e-Mohammed
 Jemaah Islamiyah
 Lashkar-e-Taiba
 Moroccan Islamic Combatant Group

Al-Qaeda's former affiliates include the following:

 Abu Sayyaf (pledged allegiance to ISIL in 2014)
 Al-Mourabitoun (joined JNIM in 2017)
 Al-Qaeda in Iraq (became the Islamic State of Iraq, which later seceded from al-Qaeda and became ISIL)
 Al-Qaeda in the Lands Beyond the Sahel (inactive since 2015)
 Ansar al-Islam (majority merged with ISIL in 2014)
 Ansar Dine (joined JNIM in 2017)
 Islamic Jihad of Yemen (became AQAP)
 Movement for Oneness and Jihad in West Africa (merged with Al-Mulathameen to form Al-Mourabitoun in 2013)
 Rajah Sulaiman movement
 Al-Nusra Front (became Hayat Tahrir al-Sham and split ties in 2017, disputed)

Leadership

Osama bin Laden (1988–May 2011) 

Osama bin Laden served as the emir of Al-Qaeda from the organization's founding in 1988 until his assassination by US forces on May 1, 2011. Atiyah Abd al-Rahman was alleged to be second in command prior to his death on August 22, 2011.

Bin Laden was advised by a Shura Council, which consists of senior Al-Qaeda members. The group was estimated to consist of 20–30 people.

After May 2011 
Ayman al-Zawahiri had been Al-Qaeda's deputy emir and assumed the role of emir following bin Laden's death. Al-Zawahiri replaced Saif al-Adel, who had served as interim commander.

On June 5, 2012, Pakistani intelligence officials announced that al-Rahman's alleged successor as second in command, Abu Yahya al-Libi, had been killed in Pakistan.

Nasir al-Wuhayshi was alleged to have become Al-Qaeda's overall second in command and general manager in 2013. He was concurrently the leader of Al-Qaeda in the Arabian Peninsula (AQAP) until he was killed by a US airstrike in Yemen in June 2015. Abu Khayr al-Masri, Wuhayshi's alleged successor as the deputy to Ayman al-Zawahiri, was killed by a US airstrike in Syria in February 2017. Al Qaeda's next alleged number two leader, Abdullah Ahmed Abdullah, was killed by Israeli agents. His pseudonym was Abu Muhammad al-Masri, who was killed in November 2020 in Iran. He was involved in the 1998 bombings of the US embassies in Kenya and Tanzania.

Al-Qaeda's network was built from scratch as a conspiratorial network which drew upon the leadership of a number of regional nodes. The organization divided itself into several committees, which include:
 The Military Committee, which is responsible for training operatives, acquiring weapons, and planning attacks.
 The Money/Business Committee, which funds the recruitment and training of operatives through the hawala banking system. US-led efforts to eradicate the sources of "terrorist financing" were most successful in the year immediately following the September 11 attacks. Al-Qaeda continues to operate through unregulated banks, such as the 1,000 or so hawaladars in Pakistan, some of which can handle deals of up to million. The committee also procures false passports, pays Al-Qaeda members, and oversees profit-driven businesses. In the 9/11 Commission Report, it was estimated that Al-Qaeda required $30million per year to conduct its operations.
 The Law Committee reviews Sharia law, and decides upon courses of action conform to it.
 The Islamic Study/Fatwah Committee issues religious edicts, such as an edict in 1998 telling Muslims to kill Americans.
 The Media Committee ran the now-defunct newspaper Nashrat al Akhbar and handled public relations.
 In 2005, Al-Qaeda formed As-Sahab, a media production house, to supply its video and audio materials.

After Al-Zawahiri (2022 - present) 
Al-Zawahiri was killed on July 31, 2022 in a drone strike in Afghanistan. In February 2023, a report from the United Nations, based on member state intelligence, concluded that de-facto leadership of Al-Qaeda had passed to Saif al-Adel, who was operating out of Iran. Adel, a former Egyptian army officer, became a military instructor Al-Qaeda camps in 1990s and was known for his involvement in the Battle of Mogadishu. The report stated that al-Adel's leadership could not officially be declared by al-Qaeda because of "political sensitivities" of Afghan government in acknowledging the death of Al-Zawahiri as well as due to "theological and operational" challenges posed by the location of al-Adel in Iran.

Command structure 
Most of Al Qaeda's top leaders and operational directors were veterans who fought against the Soviet invasion of Afghanistan in the 1980s. Osama bin Laden and his deputy, Ayman al-Zawahiri, were the leaders who were considered the operational commanders of the organization. Nevertheless, Al-Qaeda is not operationally managed by Ayman al-Zawahiri. Several operational groups exist, which consult with the leadership in situations where attacks are in preparation. Al-Qaeda central (AQC) is a conglomerate of expert committees, each in supervision of distinct tasks and objectives. Its membership is mostly composed of Egyptian Islamist leaders who participiated in the anti-communist Afghan Jihad. Assisting them are hundreds of Islamic field operatives and commanders, based in various regions of the Muslim World. The central leadership assumes control of the doctrinal approach and overall propaganda campaign; while the regional commanders were empowered with independence in military strategy and political maneuvering. This novel heirarchy made it possible for the organisation to launch wide-range offensives.

When asked in 2005 about the possibility of Al-Qaeda's connection to the July 7, 2005 London bombings, Metropolitan Police Commissioner Sir Ian Blair said: "Al-Qaeda is not an organization. Al-Qaeda is a way of working... but this has the hallmark of that approach... Al-Qaeda clearly has the ability to provide training... to provide expertise... and I think that is what has occurred here." On August 13, 2005, The Independent newspaper, reported that the July7 bombers had acted independently of an Al-Qaeda mastermind.

Nasser al-Bahri, who was Osama bin Laden's bodyguard for four years in the run-up to 9/11 wrote in his memoir a highly detailed description of how the group functioned at that time. Al-Bahri described Al-Qaeda's formal administrative structure and vast arsenal. However, the author Adam Curtis argued that the idea of Al-Qaeda as a formal organization is primarily an American invention. Curtis contended the name "Al-Qaeda" was first brought to the attention of the public in the 2001 trial of bin Laden and the four men accused of the 1998 US embassy bombings in East Africa. Curtis wrote:

During the 2001 trial, the US Department of Justice needed to show that bin Laden was the leader of a criminal organization in order to charge him in absentia under the Racketeer Influenced and Corrupt Organizations Act. The name of the organization and details of its structure were provided in the testimony of Jamal al-Fadl, who said he was a founding member of the group and a former employee of bin Laden. Questions about the reliability of al-Fadl's testimony have been raised by a number of sources because of his history of dishonesty, and because he was delivering it as part of a plea bargain agreement after being convicted of conspiring to attack US military establishments. Sam Schmidt, a defense attorney who defended al-Fadl said:

Field operatives 

The number of individuals in the group who have undergone proper military training, and are capable of commanding insurgent forces, is largely unknown. Documents captured in the raid on bin Laden's compound in 2011 show that the core Al-Qaeda membership in 2002 was 170. In 2006, it was estimated that Al-Qaeda had several thousand commanders embedded in 40 countries. , it was believed that no more than 200–300 members were still active commanders.

According to the 2004 BBC documentary The Power of Nightmares, Al-Qaeda was so weakly linked together that it was hard to say it existed apart from bin Laden and a small clique of close associates. The lack of any significant numbers of convicted Al-Qaeda members, despite a large number of arrests on terrorism charges, was cited by the documentary as a reason to doubt whether a widespread entity that met the description of Al-Qaeda existed. Al-Qaeda's commanders, as well as its sleeping agents, are hiding in different parts of the world to this day. They are mainly hunted by the American and Israeli secret services.

Insurgent forces 
According to author Robert Cassidy, Al-Qaeda maintains two separate forces which are deployed alongside insurgents in Iraq and Pakistan. The first, numbering in the tens of thousands, was "organized, trained, and equipped as insurgent combat forces" in the Soviet–Afghan war. The force was composed primarily of foreign mujahideen from Saudi Arabia and Yemen. Many of these fighters went on to fight in Bosnia and Somalia for global jihad. Another group, which numbered 10,000 in 2006, live in the West and have received rudimentary combat training.

Other analysts have described Al-Qaeda's rank and file as being "predominantly Arab" in its first years of operation, but that the organization also includes "other peoples" . It has been estimated that 62 percent of Al-Qaeda members have a university education. In 2011 and the following year, the Americans successfully settled accounts with Osama bin Laden, Anwar al-Awlaki, the organization's chief propagandist, and Abu Yahya al-Libi's deputy commander. The optimistic voices were already saying it was over for Al-Qaeda. Nevertheless, it was around this time that the Arab Spring greeted the region, the turmoil of which came great to Al-Qaeda's regional forces. Seven years later, Ayman al-Zawahiri became arguably the number one leader in the organization, implementing his strategy with systematic consistency. Tens of thousands loyal to Al-Qaeda and related organizations were able to challenge local and regional stability and ruthlessly attack their enemies in the Middle East, Africa, South Asia, Southeast Asia, Europe and Russia alike. In fact, from Northwest Africa to South Asia, Al-Qaeda had more than two dozen "franchise-based" allies. The number of Al-Qaeda militants was set at 20,000 in Syria alone, and they had 4,000 members in Yemen and about 7,000 in Somalia. The war was not over.

In 2001, Al-Qaeda had around 20 functioning cells and 70,000 insurgents spread over sixty nations. According to latest estimates, the number of active-duty soldiers under its command and allied militias have risen to approximately 250,000 by 2018.

Financing 

Al-Qaeda usually does not disburse funds for attacks, and very rarely makes wire transfers. In the 1990s, financing came partly from the personal wealth of Osama bin Laden. Other sources of income included the heroin trade and donations from supporters in Kuwait, Saudi Arabia and other Islamic Gulf states. A WikiLeaks-released 2009 internal US government cable stated that "terrorist funding emanating from Saudi Arabia remains a serious concern."

Among the first pieces of evidence regarding Saudi Arabia's support for Al-Qaeda was the so-called "Golden Chain", a list of early Al-Qaeda funders seized during a 2002 raid in Sarajevo by Bosnian police. The hand-written list was validated by Al-Qaeda defector Jamal al-Fadl, and included the names of both donors and beneficiaries. Osama bin-Laden's name appeared seven times among the beneficiaries, while 20 Saudi and Gulf-based businessmen and politicians were listed among the donors. Notable donors included Adel Batterjee, and Wael Hamza Julaidan. Batterjee was designated as a terror financier by the US Department of the Treasury in 2004, and Julaidan is recognized as one of Al-Qaeda's founders.

Documents seized during the 2002 Bosnia raid showed that Al-Qaeda widely exploited charities to channel financial and material support to its operatives across the globe. Notably, this activity exploited the International Islamic Relief Organization (IIRO) and the Muslim World League (MWL). The IIRO had ties with Al-Qaeda associates worldwide, including Al-Qaeda's deputy Ayman al Zawahiri. Zawahiri's brother worked for the IIRO in Albania and had actively recruited on behalf of Al-Qaeda. The MWL was openly identified by Al-Qaeda's leader as one of the three charities Al-Qaeda primarily relied upon for funding sources.

Allegations of Qatari support 

Several Qatari citizens have been accused of funding Al-Qaeda. This includes Abd Al-Rahman al-Nuaimi, a Qatari citizen and a human-rights activist who founded the Swiss-based non-governmental organization (NGO) Alkarama. On December 18, 2013, the US Treasury designated Nuaimi as a terrorist for his activities supporting Al-Qaeda. The US Treasury has said Nuaimi "has facilitated significant financial support to Al-Qaeda in Iraq, and served as an interlocutor between Al-Qaeda in Iraq and Qatar-based donors".

Nuaimi was accused of overseeing a $2million monthly transfer to Al-Qaeda in Iraq as part of his role as mediator between Iraq-based Al-Qaeda senior officers and Qatari citizens. Nuaimi allegedly entertained relationships with Abu-Khalid al-Suri, Al-Qaeda's top envoy in Syria, who processed a $600,000 transfer to Al-Qaeda in 2013. Nuaimi is also known to be associated with Abd al-Wahhab Muhammad 'Abd al-Rahman al-Humayqani, a Yemeni politician and founding member of Alkarama, who was listed as a Specially Designated Global Terrorist (SDGT) by the US Treasury in 2013. The US authorities claimed that Humayqani exploited his role in Alkarama to fundraise on behalf of Al-Qaeda in the Arabian Peninsula (AQAP). A prominent figure in AQAP, Nuaimi was also reported to have facilitated the flow of funding to AQAP affiliates based in Yemen. Nuaimi was also accused of investing funds in the charity directed by Humayqani to ultimately fund AQAP. About ten months after being sanctioned by the US Treasury, Nuaimi was also restrained from doing business in the UK.

Another Qatari citizen, Kalifa Mohammed Turki Subayi, was sanctioned by the US Treasury on June 5, 2008, for his activities as a "Gulf-based Al-Qaeda financier". Subayi's name was added to the UN Security Council's Sanctions List in 2008 on charges of providing financial and material support to Al-Qaeda senior leadership. Subayi allegedly moved Al-Qaeda recruits to South Asia-based training camps. He also financially supported Khalid Sheikh Mohammed, a Pakistani national and senior Al-Qaeda officer who is believed to be the mastermind behind the September 11 attack according to the September 11 Commission report.

Qataris provided support to Al-Qaeda through the country's largest NGO, the Qatar Charity. Al-Qaeda defector al-Fadl, who was a former member of Qatar Charity, testified in court that Abdullah Mohammed Yusef, who served as Qatar Charity's director, was affiliated to Al-Qaeda and simultaneously to the National Islamic Front, a political group that gave Al-Qaeda leader Osama Bin Laden harbor in Sudan in the early 1990s.

It was alleged that in 1993 Bin Laden was using Middle East based Sunni charities to channel financial support to Al-Qaeda operatives overseas. The same documents also report Bin Laden's complaint that the failed assassination attempt of Egyptian President Hosni Mubarak had compromised the ability of Al-Qaeda to exploit charities to support its operatives to the extent it was capable of before 1995.

Qatar financed Al-Qaeda's enterprises through Al-Qaeda's former affiliate in Syria, Jabhat al-Nusra. The funding was primarily channeled through kidnapping for ransom. The Consortium Against Terrorist Finance (CATF) reported that the Gulf country has funded al-Nusra since 2013. In 2017, Asharq Al-Awsat estimated that Qatar had disbursed $25million in support of al-Nusra through kidnapping for ransom. In addition, Qatar has launched fundraising campaigns on behalf of al-Nusra. Al-Nusra acknowledged a Qatar-sponsored campaign "as one of the preferred conduits for donations intended for the group".

Strategy 

In the disagreement over whether Al-Qaeda's objectives are religious or political, Mark Sedgwick describes Al-Qaeda's strategy as political in the immediate term but with ultimate aims that are religious.
On March 11, 2005, Al-Quds Al-Arabi published extracts from Saif al-Adel's document "Al Qaeda's Strategy to the Year 2020". Abdel Bari Atwan summarizes this strategy as comprising five stages to rid the Ummah from all forms of oppression:
 Provoke the United States and the West into invading a Muslim country by staging a massive attack or string of attacks on US soil that results in massive civilian casualties.
 Incite local resistance to occupying forces.
 Expand the conflict to neighboring countries and engage the US and its allies in a long war of attrition.
 Convert Al-Qaeda into an ideology and set of operating principles that can be loosely franchised in other countries without requiring direct command and control, and via these franchises incite attacks against the US and countries allied with the US until they withdraw from the conflict, as happened with the 2004 Madrid train bombings, but which did not have the same effect with the July 7, 2005 London bombings.
 The US economy will finally collapse by 2020, under the strain of multiple engagements in numerous places. This will lead to a collapse in the worldwide economic system, and lead to global political instability. This will lead to a global jihad led by Al-Qaeda, and a Wahhabi Caliphate will then be installed across the world.

Atwan noted that, while the plan is unrealistic, "it is sobering to consider that this virtually describes the downfall of the Soviet Union."

According to Fouad Hussein, a Jordanian journalist and author who has spent time in prison with Al-Zarqawi, Al Qaeda's strategy consists of seven phases and is similar to the plan described in Al Qaeda's Strategy to the year 2020. These phases include:
 "The Awakening." This phase was supposed to last from 2001 to 2003. The goal of the phase is to provoke the United States to attack a Muslim country by executing an attack that kills many civilians on US soil.
 "Opening Eyes." This phase was supposed to last from 2003 to 2006. The goal of this phase was to recruit young men to the cause and to transform the Al-Qaeda group into a movement. Iraq was supposed to become the center of all operations with financial and military support for bases in other states.
 "Arising and Standing up", was supposed to last from 2007 to 2010. In this phase, Al-Qaeda wanted to execute additional attacks and focus their attention on Syria. Hussein believed other countries in the Arabian Peninsula were also in danger.
 Al-Qaeda expected a steady growth among their ranks and territories due to the declining power of the regimes in the Arabian Peninsula. The main focus of attack in this phase was supposed to be on oil suppliers and cyberterrorism, targeting the US economy and military infrastructure.
 The declaration of an Islamic Caliphate, which was projected between 2013 and 2016. In this phase, Al-Qaeda expected the resistance from Israel to be heavily reduced.
 The declaration of an "Islamic Army" and a "fight between believers and non-believers", also called "total confrontation".
 "Definitive Victory", projected to be completed by 2020.

According to the seven-phase strategy, the war is projected to last less than two years.

According to Charles Lister of the Middle East Institute and Katherine Zimmerman of the American Enterprise Institute, the new model of Al-Qaeda is to "socialize communities" and build a broad territorial base of operations with the support of local communities, also gaining income independent of the funding of sheiks.

Name 
The English name of the organization is a simplified transliteration of the Arabic noun , which means "the foundation" or "the base". The initial al- is the Arabic definite article "the", hence "the base". In Arabic, Al-Qaeda has four syllables. Al-Qaeda's name can also be transliterated as al-Qaida, al-Qa'ida, or el-Qaida.

The doctrinal concept of "Al-Qaeda" was first coined by the Palestinian Islamist scholar and Jihadist leader Abdullah Azzam in an April 1988 issue of Al-Jihad magazine to describe a religiously committed vanguard of Muslims who wage armed Jihad globally to liberate oppressed Muslims from foreign invaders, establish sharia (Islamic law) across the Islamic World by overthrowing the ruling secular governments; and thus restore the past Islamic prowess. This was to be implemented by establishing an Islamic state that would nurture generations of Muslim soldiers that would perpetually attack United States and its allied governments in the Muslim World. Numerous historical models were cited by Azzam as successful examples of his call; starting from the early Muslim conquests of the 7th century to the recent anti-Soviet Afghan Jihad of 1980s. According to Azzam's world-view: "It is about time to think about a state that would be a solid base for the distribution of the (Islamic) creed, and a fortress to host the preachers from the hell of the Jahiliyyah [the pre-Islamic period]."

Bin Laden explained the origin of the term in a videotaped interview with Al Jazeera journalist Tayseer Alouni in October 2001:

It has been argued that two documents seized from the Sarajevo office of the Benevolence International Foundation prove the name was not simply adopted by the mujahideen movement and that a group called Al-Qaeda was established in August 1988. Both of these documents contain minutes of meetings held to establish a new military group, and contain the term "Al-Qaeda".

Former British Foreign Secretary Robin Cook wrote that the word Al-Qaeda should be translated as "the database", because it originally referred to the computer file of the thousands of mujahideen militants who were recruited and trained with CIA help to defeat the Russians. In April 2002, the group assumed the name Qa'idat al-Jihad, which means "the base of Jihad". According to Diaa Rashwan, this was "apparently as a result of the merger of the overseas branch of Egypt's al-Jihad, which was led by Ayman al-Zawahiri, with the groups Bin Laden brought under his control after his return to Afghanistan in the mid-1990s."

Ideology 

The militant Islamist Salafist movement of Al-Qaeda developed during the Islamic revival and the rise of the Islamist movement after the Iranian Revolution (1978–1979) and the Afghan Jihad (1979-1989). Many scholars have argued that the writings of Islamic author and thinker Sayyid Qutb inspired the Al-Qaeda organization. In the 1950s and 1960s, Qutb preached that because of the lack of sharia law, the Muslim world was no longer Muslim, and had reverted to the pre-Islamic ignorance known as jahiliyyah. To restore Islam, Qutb argued that a vanguard of righteous Muslims was needed in order to establish "true Islamic states", implement sharia, and rid the Muslim world of any non-Muslim influences. In Qutb's view, the enemies of Islam included "world Jewry", which "plotted conspiracies" and opposed Islam. Qutb envisioned this vanguard to march forward to wage armed Jihad against tyrannical regimes after purifying from the wider Jahili societies and organising themselves under a righteous Islamic leadership; which he viewed as the model of early Muslims in the Islamic state of Medina under the leadership of Islamic Prophet Muhammad. This idea would directly influence many Islamist figures such as Abdullah Azzam and Usama Bin Laden; and became the core rationale for the formulation of "Al-Qaeda" concept in the near future. Outlining his strategy to topple the existing secular orders, Qutb argued in Milestones: "[It is necessary that] a Muslim community to come into existence which believes that ‘there is no deity except God,’ which commits itself to obey none but God, denying all other authority, and which challenges the legality of any law which is not based on this belief.. . It should come into the battlefield with the determination that its strategy, its social organization, and the relationship between its individuals should be firmer and more powerful than the existing jahili system."
In the words of Mohammed Jamal Khalifa, a close college friend of bin Laden: 

Qutb also influenced Ayman al-Zawahiri. Zawahiri's uncle and maternal family patriarch, Mafouz Azzam, was Qutb's student, protégé, personal lawyer, and an executor of his estate. Azzam was one of the last people to see Qutb alive before his execution. Zawahiri paid homage to Qutb in his work Knights under the Prophet's Banner.

Qutb argued that many Muslims were not true Muslims. Some Muslims, Qutb argued, were apostates. These alleged apostates included leaders of Muslim countries, since they failed to enforce sharia law. He also alleged that the West approaches the Muslim World with a "crusading spirit"; in spite of the decline of religious values in the 20th century Europe. According to Qutb; the hostile and imperialist attitudes exhibited by Europeans and Americans towards Muslim countries, their support for Zionism, etc. reflected hatred amplified over a millennia of wars such as the Crusades and was born out of Roman materialist and utilitarian outlooks that viewed the world in monetary terms.

Formation 

The Afghan jihad against the pro-Soviet government further developed the Salafist Jihadist movement which inspired Al-Qaeda. During this period, Al-Qaeda embraced the ideals of the South Asian militant revivalist Sayyid Ahmad Shahid (d. 1831/1246 A.H) who led a Jihad movement against British India from the frontiers of Afghanistan and Khyber-Pakhtunkwa in the early 19th century. Al-Qaeda readily adopted Sayyid Ahmad's doctrines such as returning to the purity of early generations (Salaf as-Salih), antipathy towards Western influences and restoration of Islamic political power. According to Pakistani journalist Hussain Haqqani,

Objectives 
The long-term objective of Al-Qaeda is to unite the Muslim World under a supra-national Islamic state known as the Khilafah (Caliphate), headed by an elected Caliph descended from the Ahl al-Bayt (Prophetic family). The immediate objectives include the expulsion of American troops from the Arabian Peninsula, waging armed Jihad to topple US-allied governments in the region, etc.

The following are the goals and some of the general policies outlined in Al-Qaeda's Founding Charter "Al-Qaeda's Structure and Bylaws" issued in the meetings in Peshawar in 1988.:

Theory of Islamic State 

Al Qaeda aims to establish an Islamic state in the Arab World, modelled after the Rashidun Caliphate, by initiating a global Jihad against the "International Jewish-Crusader Alliance" led by the United States, which it sees as the "external enemy" and against the secular governments in Muslim countries, that are described as "the apostate domestic enemy". Once foreign influences and the secular ruling authorities are removed from Muslim countries through Jihad; Al Qaeda supports elections to choose the rulers of its proposed Islamic states. This is to be done through representatives of leadership councils (Shura) that would ensure the implementation of Shari'a (Islamic law). However, it opposes elections that institute parliaments which empower Muslim and non-Muslim legislators to collaborate in making laws of their own choosing. In the second edition of his book Knights Under the Banner of the Prophet, Ayman Al Zawahiri writes:

Grievances 
A recurring theme in Al-Qaeda's ideology is the perpetual grievance over the violent subjugation of Islamic dissidents by the authoritarian, secularist regimes allied to the West. Al-Qaeda denounces these post-colonial governments as a system led by Westernised elites designed to advance neo-colonialism and maintain Western hegemony over the Muslim World. The most prominent topic of grievance is over the American foreign policy in the Arab World; especially over its strong economic and military support to Israel. Other concerns of resentment include presence of NATO troops to support allied regimes; injustices committed against Muslims in Kashmir, Chechnya, Xinjiang, Syria, Afghanistan, Iraq etc.

Religious compatibility 
Abdel Bari Atwan wrote that:

Attacks on civilians 
Following its 9/11 attack and in response to its condemnation by Islamic scholars, Al-Qaeda provided a justification for the killing of non-combatants/civilians, entitled, "A Statement from Qaidat al-Jihad Regarding the Mandates of the Heroes and the Legality of the Operations in New York and Washington". According to a couple of critics, Quintan Wiktorowicz and John Kaltner, it provides "ample theological justification for killing civilians in almost any imaginable situation."

Among these justifications are that America is leading the west in waging a War on Islam so that attacks on America are a defense of Islam and any treaties and agreements between Muslim majority states and Western countries that would be violated by attacks are null and void. According to the tract, several conditions allow for the killing of civilians including:
 retaliation for the American war on Islam which Al-Qaeda alleges has targeted "Muslim women, children and elderly";
 when it is too difficult to distinguish between non-combatants and combatants when attacking an enemy "stronghold" (hist) and/or non-combatants remain in enemy territory, killing them is allowed;
 those who assist the enemy "in deed, word, mind" are eligible for killing, and this includes the general population in democratic countries because civilians can vote in elections that bring enemies of Islam to power;
 the necessity of killing in the war to protect Islam and Muslims;
 the prophet Muhammad, when asked whether the Muslim fighters could use the catapult against the village of Taif, replied affirmatively, even though the enemy fighters were mixed with a civilian population;
 if the women, children and other protected groups serve as human shields for the enemy;
 if the enemy has broken a treaty, killing of civilians is permitted.

History 
The Guardian in 2009 described five distinct phases in the development of Al-Qaeda: its beginnings in the late 1980s, a "wilderness" period in 1990–1996, its "heyday" in 1996–2001, a network period from 2001 to 2005, and a period of fragmentation from 2005 to 2009.

Jihad in Afghanistan 

The origins of Al-Qaeda can be traced to the Soviet War in Afghanistan (December 1979February 1989). The United States viewed the conflict in Afghanistan in terms of the Cold War, with Marxists on one side and the native Afghan mujahideen on the other. This view led to a CIA program called Operation Cyclone, which channeled funds through Pakistan's Inter-Services Intelligence agency to the Afghan Mujahideen. The US government provided substantial financial support to the Afghan Islamic militants. Aid to Gulbuddin Hekmatyar, an Afghan mujahideen leader and founder of the Hezb-e Islami, amounted to more than $600million. In addition to American aid, Hekmatyar was the recipient of Saudi aid. In the early 1990s, after the US had withdrawn support, Hekmatyar "worked closely" with bin Laden.

At the same time, a growing number of Arab mujahideen joined the jihad against the Afghan Marxist regime, which was facilitated by international Muslim organizations, particularly the Maktab al-Khidamat (MAK), also known as the "Services Bureau". Muslim Brotherhood networks affiliated with the Egyptian Islamist Kamal al-Sananiri (d. 1981) played the major role in raising finances and Arab recruits for the Afghan Mujahidin. These networks included Mujahidin groups affiliated with Afghan commander Abd al-Rasul Sayyaf and Abdullah Yusuf Azzam, Palestinian Islamist scholar and major figure in the Jordanian Muslim Brotherhood. Following the detention and death of Sananiri in an Egyptian security prison in 1981, Abdullah Azzam became the chief arbitrator between the Afghan Arabs and Afghan mujahideen.

As part of providing weaponry and supplies for the cause of Afghan Jihad, Usama Bin Laden was sent to Pakistan as a Muslim Brotherhood representative to the Islamist organisation Jamaat-e-Islami. While in Peshawar, Bin Laden met Abdullah Azzam and the two of them jointly established the Maktab al-Khidamat (MAK) in 1984; with objective of raising funds and recruits for Afghan Jihad across the world. MAK organized guest houses in Peshawar, near the Afghan border, and gathered supplies for the construction of paramilitary training camps to prepare foreign recruits for the Afghan war front. MAK was funded by the Saudi government as well as by individual Muslims including Saudi businessmen. Bin Laden also became a major financier of the mujahideen, spending his own money and using his connections to influence public opinion about the war. Many disgruntled members of the Syrian Muslim Brotherhood like Abu Mussab al-Suri also began joining these MAK networks; following the crushing of Islamic revolt in Syria in 1982.

From 1986, MAK began to set up a network of recruiting offices in the US, the hub of which was the Al Kifah Refugee Center at the Farouq Mosque on Brooklyn's Atlantic Avenue. Among notable figures at the Brooklyn center were "double agent" Ali Mohamed, whom FBI special agent Jack Cloonan called "bin Laden's first trainer", and "Blind Sheikh" Omar Abdel-Rahman, a leading recruiter of mujahideen for Afghanistan. Azzam and bin Laden began to establish camps in Afghanistan in 1987.

MAK and foreign mujahideen volunteers, or "Afghan Arabs", did not play a major role in the war. While over 250,000 Afghan mujahideen fought the Soviets and the communist Afghan government, it is estimated that there were never more than two thousand foreign mujahideen on the field at any one time. Nonetheless, foreign mujahideen volunteers came from 43 countries, and the total number who participated in the Afghan movement between 1982 and 1992 is reported to have been 35,000. Bin Laden played a central role in organizing training camps for the foreign Muslim volunteers.

The Soviet Union withdrew from Afghanistan in 1989. Mohammad Najibullah's Communist Afghan government lasted for three more years, before it was overrun by elements of the mujahideen.

Expanding operations 
Toward the end of the Soviet military mission in Afghanistan, some foreign mujahideen wanted to expand their operations to include Islamist struggles in other parts of the world, such as Palestine and Kashmir. A number of overlapping and interrelated organizations were formed, to further those aspirations. One of these was the organization that would eventually be called Al-Qaeda.

Research suggests that Al-Qaeda was formed on August 11, 1988, when a meeting in Afghanistan between leaders of Egyptian Islamic Jihad, Abdullah Azzam, and bin Laden took place. The network was founded in 1988 by Osama bin Laden, Abdullah Azzam, and other Arab volunteers during the Soviet–Afghan War. An agreement was reached to link bin Laden's money with the expertise of the Islamic Jihad organization and take up the jihadist cause elsewhere after the Soviets withdrew from Afghanistan. After fighting the "holy" war, the group aimed to expand such operations to other parts of the world, setting up bases in parts of Africa, the Arab world and elsewhere, carrying out many attacks on people whom it considers kāfir.

Notes indicate Al-Qaeda was a formal group by August 20, 1988. A list of requirements for membership itemized the following: listening ability, good manners, obedience, and making a pledge (Bay'at) to follow one's superiors. In his memoir, bin Laden's former bodyguard, Nasser al-Bahri, gives the only publicly available description of the ritual of giving bay'at when he swore his allegiance to the Al-Qaeda chief. According to Wright, the group's real name was not used in public pronouncements because "its existence was still a closely held secret."

After Azzam was assassinated in 1989 and MAK broke up, significant numbers of MAK followers joined bin Laden's new organization.

In November 1989, Ali Mohamed, a former special forces sergeant stationed at Fort Bragg, North Carolina, left military service and moved to California. He traveled to Afghanistan and Pakistan and became "deeply involved with bin Laden's plans." In 1991, Ali Mohammed is said to have helped orchestrate bin Laden's relocation to Sudan.

Gulf War and the start of US enmity 

Following the Soviet Union's withdrawal from Afghanistan in February 1989, bin Laden returned to Saudi Arabia. The Iraqi invasion of Kuwait in August 1990 had put the Kingdom and its ruling House of Saud at risk. The world's most valuable oil fields were within striking distance of Iraqi forces in Kuwait, and Saddam's call to Pan-Arabism could potentially rally internal dissent.

In the face of a seemingly massive Iraqi military presence, Saudi Arabia's own forces were outnumbered. Bin Laden offered the services of his mujahideen to King Fahd to protect Saudi Arabia from the Iraqi army. The Saudi monarch refused bin Laden's offer, opting instead to allow US and allied forces to deploy troops into Saudi territory.

The deployment angered bin Laden, as he believed the presence of foreign troops in the "land of the two mosques" (Mecca and Medina) profaned sacred soil. King Fahd's refusal of Bin Laden's offer to train the Mujahidin; instead giving permission for American soldiers to enter Saudi territory inorder to repel Saddam Hussein's forces would greatly anger Bin Laden. The entry of American troops into Saudi Arabia was denounced by Bin Laden as a "Crusader Attack on Islam" that defiled the sacred lands of Islam. He asserted that the Arabian Peninsula has been "occupied" by foreign invaders and excommunicated the Saudi regime due to its complicity with United States. After speaking publicly against the Saudi government for harboring American troops and rejecting their legitimacy, he was banished and forced to live in exile in Sudan. Bin Laden also vehemently denounced the elder Wahhabi scholarship; most notably Grand Mufti Abd al-Azeez Ibn Baz, accusing him of partnering with infidel forces over his verdict that permitted the entry of US troops.

Sudan 
From around 1992 to 1996, Al-Qaeda and bin Laden based themselves in Sudan at the invitation of Islamist theoretician Hassan al-Turabi. The move followed an Islamist coup d'état in Sudan, led by Colonel Omar al-Bashir, who professed a commitment to reordering Muslim political values. During this time, bin Laden assisted the Sudanese government, bought or set up various business enterprises, and established training camps.

A key turning point for bin Laden occurred in 1993 when Saudi Arabia gave support for the Oslo Accords, which set a path for peace between Israel and Palestinians. Due to bin Laden's continuous verbal assault on King Fahd of Saudi Arabia, Fahd sent an emissary to Sudan on March 5, 1994, demanding bin Laden's passport. Bin Laden's Saudi citizenship was also revoked. His family was persuaded to cut off his stipend, $7million a year, and his Saudi assets were frozen. His family publicly disowned him. There is controversy as to what extent bin Laden continued to garner support from members afterwards.

In 1993, a young schoolgirl was killed in an unsuccessful attempt on the life of the Egyptian prime minister, Atef Sedki. Egyptian public opinion turned against Islamist bombings, and the police arrested 280 of al-Jihad's members and executed 6. In June 1995, an attempt to assassinate Egyptian president Mubarak led to the expulsion of Egyptian Islamic Jihad (EIJ), and in May 1996, of bin Laden from Sudan.

According to Pakistani-American businessman Mansoor Ijaz, the Sudanese government offered the Clinton Administration numerous opportunities to arrest bin Laden. Ijaz's claims appeared in numerous op-ed pieces, including one in the Los Angeles Times and one in The Washington Post co-written with former Ambassador to Sudan Timothy M. Carney. Similar allegations have been made by Vanity Fair contributing editor David Rose, and Richard Miniter, author of Losing bin Laden, in a November 2003 interview with World.

Several sources dispute Ijaz's claim, including the 9/11 Commission, which concluded in part:

Refuge in Afghanistan 

After the fall of the Afghan communist regime in 1992, Afghanistan was effectively ungoverned for four years and plagued by constant infighting between various mujahideen groups. This situation allowed the Taliban to organize. The Taliban also garnered support from graduates of Islamic schools, which are called madrassa. According to Ahmed Rashid, five leaders of the Taliban were graduates of Darul Uloom Haqqania, a madrassa in the small town of Akora Khattak. The town is situated near Peshawar in Pakistan, but the school is largely attended by Afghan refugees. This institution reflected Salafi beliefs in its teachings, and much of its funding came from private donations from wealthy Arabs. Four of the Taliban's leaders attended a similarly funded and influenced madrassa in Kandahar. Bin Laden's contacts were laundering donations to these schools, and Islamic banks were used to transfer money to an "array" of charities which served as front groups for Al-Qaeda.

Many of the mujahideen who later joined the Taliban fought alongside Afghan warlord Mohammad Nabi Mohammadi's Harkat i Inqilabi group at the time of the Russian invasion. This group also enjoyed the loyalty of most Afghan Arab fighters.

The continuing lawlessness enabled the growing and well-disciplined Taliban to expand their control over territory in Afghanistan, and it came to establish an enclave which it called the Islamic Emirate of Afghanistan. In 1994, it captured the regional center of Kandahar, and after making rapid territorial gains thereafter, the Taliban captured the capital city Kabul in September 1996.

In 1996, Taliban-controlled Afghanistan provided a perfect staging ground for Al-Qaeda. While not officially working together, Al-Qaeda enjoyed the Taliban's protection and supported the regime in such a strong symbiotic relationship that many Western observers dubbed the Taliban's Islamic Emirate of Afghanistan as, "the world's first terrorist-sponsored state." However, at this time, only Pakistan, Saudi Arabia, and the United Arab Emirates recognized the Taliban as the legitimate government of Afghanistan. In 1996, Osama Bin Laden officially issued the "Declaration of Struggle against the Americans Occupying the Land of the Two Holy Mosques" which called upon Muslims all over the world to take up arms against American soldiers. In an interview with the English journalist Robert Fisk; Bin Laden criticised American imperialism and its support for Zionism as the biggest sources of tyranny in the Arab World. He vehemently denounced the US-allied Gulf monarchies; especially the Saudi government for westernising the country, removing Islamic laws and hosting American, British and French troops. Bin Laden asserted that he planned to foment an armed rebellion to overthrow the Saudi regime with the help of his Mujahidin soldiers and establish an Islamic Emirate in Arabian Peninsula that properly upholds Sharia (Islamic law). Upon questioned whether he sought to launch a war against the Western world; Bin Laden replied: "It is not a declaration of war - it's a real description of the situation. This doesn't mean declaring war against the West and Western people - but against the American regime which is against every Muslim."

In response to the 1998 United States embassy bombings, an Al-Qaeda base in Khost Province was attacked by the United States during Operation Infinite Reach.

While in Afghanistan, the Taliban government tasked Al-Qaeda with the training of Brigade 055, an elite element of the Taliban's army. The Brigade mostly consisted of foreign fighters, veterans from the Soviet Invasion, and adherents to the ideology of the mujahideen. In November 2001, as Operation Enduring Freedom had toppled the Taliban government, many Brigade 055 fighters were captured or killed, and those who survived were thought to have escaped into Pakistan along with bin Laden.

By the end of 2008, some sources reported that the Taliban had severed any remaining ties with Al-Qaeda, however, there is reason to doubt this. According to senior US military intelligence officials, there were fewer than 100 members of Al-Qaeda remaining in Afghanistan in 2009.

Al Qaeda chief, Asim Omar was killed in Afghanistan's Musa Qala district after a joint US–Afghanistan commando airstrike on September 23, Afghan's National Directorate of Security (NDS) confirmed in October 2019.

In a report released May 27, 2020, the United Nations' Analytical Support and Sanctions Monitoring Team stated that the Taliban-Al Qaeda relations remain strong to this day and additionally, Al Qaeda itself has admitted that it operates inside Afghanistan.

On July 26, 2020, a United Nations report stated that the Al Qaeda group is still active in twelve provinces in Afghanistan and its leader al-Zawahiri is still based in the country. and that the UN Monitoring Team estimated that the total number of Al Qaeda fighters in Afghanistan were "between 400 and 600".

Call for global Salafi jihadism 

In 1994, the Salafi groups waging Salafi jihadism in Bosnia entered into decline, and groups such as the Egyptian Islamic Jihad began to drift away from the Salafi cause in Europe. Al-Qaeda stepped in and assumed control of around 80% of non-state armed cells in Bosnia in late 1995. At the same time, Al-Qaeda ideologues instructed the network's recruiters to look for Jihadi international Muslims who believed that extremist-jihad must be fought on a global level. Al-Qaeda also sought to open the "offensive phase" of the global Salafi jihad. Bosnian Islamists in 2006 called for "solidarity with Islamic causes around the world", supporting the insurgents in Kashmir and Iraq as well as the groups fighting for a Palestinian state.

Fatwas 
In 1996, Al-Qaeda announced its jihad to expel foreign troops and interests from what they considered Islamic lands. Bin Laden issued a fatwa, which amounted to a public declaration of war against the US and its allies, and began to refocus Al-Qaeda's resources on large-scale, propagandist strikes.

On February 23, 1998, bin Laden and Ayman al-Zawahiri, a leader of Egyptian Islamic Jihad, along with three other Islamist leaders, co-signed and issued a fatwa calling on Muslims to kill Americans and their allies. Under the banner of the World Islamic Front for Combat Against the Jews and Crusaders, they declared:

Neither bin Laden nor al-Zawahiri possessed the traditional Islamic scholarly qualifications to issue a fatwa. However, they rejected the authority of the contemporary ulema (which they saw as the paid servants of jahiliyya rulers), and took it upon themselves.

Philippines 
Al-Qaeda-affiliated terrorist Ramzi Yousef operated in the Philippines in the mid-1990s and trained Abu Sayyaf soldiers. The 2002 edition of the United States Department's Patterns of Global Terrorism mention links of Abu Sayyaf to Al-Qaeda. Abu Sayyaf is known for a series of kidnappings from tourists in both the Philippines and Malaysia that netted them large sums of money through ransoms. The leader of Abu Sayyaf, Abdurajak Abubakar Janjalani, was also a veteran fighting in the Soviet-Afghan War. In 2014, Abu Sayyaf pledged allegiance to the Islamic State group.

Iraq 

Al-Qaeda has launched attacks against the Iraqi Shia majority in an attempt to incite sectarian violence. Al-Zarqawi purportedly declared an all-out war on Shiites while claiming responsibility for Shiite mosque bombings. The same month, a statement claiming to be from Al-Qaeda in Iraq was rejected as a "fake". In a December 2007 video, al-Zawahiri defended the Islamic State in Iraq, but distanced himself from the attacks against civilians, which he deemed to be perpetrated by "hypocrites and traitors existing among the ranks".

US and Iraqi officials accused Al-Qaeda in Iraq of trying to slide Iraq into a full-scale civil war between Iraq's Shiite population and Sunni Arabs. This was done through an orchestrated campaign of civilian massacres and a number of provocative attacks against high-profile religious targets. With attacks including the 2003 Imam Ali Mosque bombing, the 2004 Day of Ashura and Karbala and Najaf bombings, the 2006 first al-Askari Mosque bombing in Samarra, the deadly single-day series of bombings in which at least 215 people were killed in Baghdad's Shiite district of Sadr City, and the second al-Askari bombing in 2007, Al-Qaeda in Iraq provoked Shiite militias to unleash a wave of retaliatory attacks, resulting in death squad-style killings and further sectarian violence which escalated in 2006. In 2008, sectarian bombings blamed on Al-Qaeda in Iraq killed at least 42 people at the Imam Husayn Shrine in Karbala in March, and at least 51 people at a bus stop in Baghdad in June.

In February 2014, after a prolonged dispute with Al-Qaeda in Iraq's successor organisation, the Islamic State of Iraq and the Levant (ISIS), Al-Qaeda publicly announced it was cutting all ties with the group, reportedly for its brutality and "notorious intractability".

Somalia and Yemen 

In Somalia, Al-Qaeda agents had been collaborating closely with its Somali wing, which was created from the al-Shabaab group. In February 2012, al-Shabaab officially joined Al-Qaeda, declaring loyalty in a video. Somali Al-Qaeda recruited children for suicide-bomber training and recruited young people to participate in militant actions against Americans.

The percentage of attacks in the First World originating from the Afghanistan–Pakistan (AfPak) border declined starting in 2007, as Al-Qaeda shifted to Somalia and Yemen. While Al-Qaeda leaders were hiding in the tribal areas along the AfPak border, middle-tier leaders heightened activity in Somalia and Yemen.

In January 2009, Al-Qaeda's division in Saudi Arabia merged with its Yemeni wing to form Al-Qaeda in the Arabian Peninsula (AQAP). Centered in Yemen, the group takes advantage of the country's poor economy, demography and domestic security. In August 2009, the group made an assassination attempt against a member of the Saudi royal family. President Obama asked Ali Abdullah Saleh to ensure closer cooperation with the US in the struggle against the growing activity of Al-Qaeda in Yemen, and promised to send additional aid. The wars in Iraq and Afghanistan drew US attention from Somalia and Yemen. In December 2011, US Secretary of Defense Leon Panetta said the US operations against Al-Qaeda "are now concentrating on key groups in Yemen, Somalia and North Africa." Al-Qaeda in the Arabian Peninsula claimed responsibility for the 2009 bombing attack on Northwest Airlines Flight 253 by Umar Farouk Abdulmutallab. The AQAP declared the Al-Qaeda Emirate in Yemen on March 31, 2011, after capturing the most of the Abyan Governorate.

As the Saudi-led military intervention in Yemen escalated in July 2015, fifty civilians had been killed and twenty million needed aid. In February 2016, Al-Qaeda forces and Saudi Arabian-led coalition forces were both seen fighting Houthi rebels in the same battle. In August 2018, Al Jazeera reported that "A military coalition battling Houthi rebels secured secret deals with Al-Qaeda in Yemen and recruited hundreds of the group's fighters.... Key figures in the deal-making said the United States was aware of the arrangements and held off on drone attacks against the armed group, which was created by Osama bin Laden in 1988."

United States operations 
In December 1998, the Director of the CIA Counterterrorism Center reported to President Bill Clinton that Al-Qaeda was preparing to launch attacks in the United States, and the group was training personnel to hijack aircraft. On September 11, 2001, Al-Qaeda attacked the United States, hijacking four airliners within the country and deliberately crashing two into the twin towers of the World Trade Center in New York City. The third plane crashed into the western side of the Pentagon in Arlington County, Virginia. The fourth plane was crashed into a field in Shanksville, Pennsylvania. In total, the attackers killed 2,977 victims and injured more than 6,000 others.

US officials noted that Anwar al-Awlaki had considerable reach within the US. A former FBI agent identified Awlaki as a known "senior recruiter for Al-Qaeda", and a spiritual motivator. Awlaki's sermons in the US were attended by three of the 9/11 hijackers, and accused Fort Hood shooter Nidal Hasan. US intelligence intercepted emails from Hasan to Awlaki between December 2008 and early 2009. On his website, Awlaki has praised Hasan's actions in the Fort Hood shooting.

An unnamed official claimed there was good reason to believe Awlaki "has been involved in very serious terrorist activities since leaving the US [in 2002], including plotting attacks against America and our allies." US President Barack Obama approved the targeted killing of al-Awlaki by April 2010, making al-Awlaki the first US citizen ever placed on the CIA target list. That required the consent of the US National Security Council, and officials argued that the attack was appropriate because the individual posed an imminent danger to national security. In May 2010, Faisal Shahzad, who pleaded guilty to the 2010 Times Square car bombing attempt, told interrogators he was "inspired by" al-Awlaki, and sources said Shahzad had made contact with al-Awlaki over the Internet. Representative Jane Harman called him "terrorist number one", and Investor's Business Daily called him "the world's most dangerous man". In July 2010, the US Treasury Department added him to its list of Specially Designated Global Terrorists, and the UN added him to its list of individuals associated with Al-Qaeda. In August 2010, al-Awlaki's father initiated a lawsuit against the US government with the American Civil Liberties Union, challenging its order to kill al-Awlaki. In October 2010, US and UK officials linked al-Awlaki to the 2010 cargo plane bomb plot. In September 2011, al-Awlaki was killed in a targeted killing drone attack in Yemen. On March 16, 2012, it was reported that Osama bin Laden plotted to kill US President Barack Obama.

Killing of Osama bin Laden 

On May 1, 2011, US President Barack Obama announced that Osama bin Laden had been killed by "a small team of Americans" acting under direct orders, in a covert operation in Abbottabad, Pakistan. According to US officials, a team of 20–25 US Navy SEALs under the command of the Joint Special Operations Command stormed bin Laden's compound with two helicopters. Bin Laden and those with him were killed during a firefight in which US forces experienced no casualties. According to one US official the attack was carried out without the knowledge or consent of the Pakistani authorities. In Pakistan some people were reported to be shocked at the unauthorized incursion by US armed forces. The site is a few miles from the Pakistan Military Academy in Kakul. In his broadcast announcement President Obama said that US forces "took care to avoid civilian casualties".
Details soon emerged that three men and a woman were killed along with bin Laden, the woman being killed when she was "used as a shield by a male combatant". DNA from bin Laden's body, compared with DNA samples on record from his dead sister, confirmed bin Laden's identity. The body was recovered by the US military and was in its custody until, according to one US official, his body was buried at sea according to Islamic traditions. One US official said that "finding a country willing to accept the remains of the world's most wanted terrorist would have been difficult." US State Department issued a "Worldwide caution" for Americans following bin Laden's death and US diplomatic facilities everywhere were placed on high alert, a senior US official said. Crowds gathered outside the White House and in New York City's Times Square to celebrate bin Laden's death.

Syria 

In 2003, President Bashar al-Assad revealed in an interview with a Kuwaiti newspaper that he doubted Al-Qaeda even existed. He was quoted as saying, "Is there really an entity called Al-Qaeda? Was it in Afghanistan? Does it exist now?" He went on further to remark about bin Laden, commenting "[he] cannot talk on the phone or use the Internet, but he can direct communications to the four corners of the world? This is illogical."

Following the mass protests that took place in 2011, which demanded the resignation of al-Assad, Al-Qaeda-affiliated groups and Sunni sympathizers soon began to constitute an effective fighting force against al-Assad. Before the Syrian Civil War, Al-Qaeda's presence in Syria was negligible, but its growth thereafter was rapid. Groups such as the al-Nusra Front and the Islamic State of Iraq and the Levant have recruited many foreign Mujahideen to train and fight in what has gradually become a highly sectarian war. Ideologically, the Syrian Civil War has served the interests of Al-Qaeda as it pits a mainly Sunni opposition against a secular government. Al-Qaeda and other fundamentalist Sunni militant groups have invested heavily in the civil conflict, at times actively backing and supporting the mainstream Syrian Opposition.

On February 2, 2014, Al-Qaeda distanced itself from ISIS and its actions in Syria; however, during 2014–15, ISIS and the Al-Qaeda-linked al-Nusra Front were still able to occasionally cooperate in their fight against the Syrian government. Al-Nusra (backed by Saudi Arabia and Turkey as part of the Army of Conquest during 2015–2017) launched many attacks and bombings, mostly against targets affiliated with or supportive of the Syrian government. From October 2015, Russian air strikes targeted positions held by al-Nusra Front, as well as other Islamist and non-Islamist rebels, while the US also targeted al-Nusra with airstrikes. In early 2016, a leading ISIL ideologue described Al-Qaeda as the "Jews of jihad".

India 

In September 2014, al-Zawahiri announced Al-Qaeda was establishing a front in India to "wage jihad against its enemies, to liberate its land, to restore its sovereignty, and to revive its Caliphate." Al-Zawahiri nominated India as a beachhead for regional jihad taking in neighboring countries such as Myanmar and Bangladesh. The motivation for the video was questioned, as it appeared the militant group was struggling to remain relevant in light of the emerging prominence of ISIS. The new wing was to be known as "Qaedat al-Jihad fi'shibhi al-qarrat al-Hindiya" or al-Qaida in the Indian Subcontinent (AQIS). Leaders of several Indian Muslim organizations rejected al-Zawahiri's pronouncement, saying they could see no good coming from it, and viewed it as a threat to Muslim youth in the country.

In 2014, Zee News reported that Bruce Riedel, a former CIA analyst and National Security Council official for South Asia, had accused the Pakistani military intelligence and Inter-Services Intelligence (ISI) of organising and assisting Al-Qaeda to organise in India, that Pakistan ought to be warned that it will be placed on the list of State Sponsors of Terrorism, and that "Zawahiri made the tape in his hideout in Pakistan, no doubt, and many Indians suspect the ISI is helping to protect him."

In September 2021, after the success of 2021 Taliban offensive, Al-Qaeda congratulated Taliban and called for liberation of Kashmir from the "clutches of the enemies of Islam".

Attacks 

Al-Qaeda has carried out a total of six major attacks, four of them in its jihad against America. In each case the leadership planned the attack years in advance, arranging for the shipment of weapons and explosives and using its businesses to provide operatives with safehouses and false identities.

1991 
To prevent the former Afghan king Mohammed Zahir Shah from coming back from exile and possibly becoming head of a new government, bin Laden instructed a Portuguese convert to Islam, Paulo Jose de Almeida Santos, to assassinate Zahir Shah. On November 4, 1991, Santos entered the king's villa in Rome posing as a journalist and tried to stab him with a dagger. A tin of cigarillos in the king's breast pocket deflected the blade and saved Zahir Shah's life. Santos was apprehended and jailed for 10 years in Italy.

1992 
On December 29, 1992, Al-Qaeda launched the 1992 Yemen hotel bombings. Two bombs were detonated in Aden, Yemen. The first target was the Movenpick Hotel and the second was the parking lot of the Goldmohur Hotel.

The bombings were an attempt to eliminate American soldiers on their way to Somalia to take part in the international famine relief effort, Operation Restore Hope. Internally, Al-Qaeda considered the bombing a victory that frightened the Americans away, but in the US, the attack was barely noticed. No American soldiers were killed because no soldiers were staying in the hotel which was bombed. However, an Australian tourist and a Yemeni hotel worker were killed in the bombing. Seven others, mostly Yemenis, were severely injured. Two fatwas are said to have been appointed by Al-Qaeda's members, Mamdouh Mahmud Salim, to justify the killings according to Islamic law. Salim referred to a famous fatwa appointed by Ibn Taymiyyah, a 13th-century scholar much admired by Wahhabis, which sanctioned resistance by any means during the Mongol invasions.

Late 1990s 

In 1996, bin Laden personally engineered a plot to assassinate United States President Bill Clinton while the president was in Manila for the Asia-Pacific Economic Cooperation. However, intelligence agents intercepted a message before the motorcade was to leave, and alerted the US Secret Service. Agents later discovered a bomb planted under a bridge.

On August 7, 1998, Al-Qaeda bombed the US embassies in East Africa, killing 224 people, including 12 Americans. In retaliation, a barrage of cruise missiles launched by the US military devastated an Al-Qaeda base in Khost, Afghanistan. The network's capacity was unharmed.

On October 12, 2000, Al-Qaeda militants in Yemen bombed the missile destroyer USS Cole in a suicide attack, killing 17 US servicemen and damaging the vessel while it lay offshore. Inspired by the success of such a brazen attack, Al-Qaeda's command core began to prepare for an attack on the US itself.

September 11 attacks 

The September 11 attacks on America by Al-Qaeda killed 2,996 people2,507 civilians, 343 firefighters, 72 law enforcement officers, 55 military personnel as well as 19 hijackers who committed murder-suicide. Two commercial airliners were deliberately flown into the twin towers of the World Trade Center, a third into the Pentagon, and a fourth, originally intended to target either the United States Capitol or the White House, crashed in a field in Stonycreek Township near Shanksville, Pennsylvania. It was the deadliest foreign attack on American soil since the Japanese attack on Pearl Harbor on December 7, 1941, and to this day remains the deadliest terrorist attack in human history.

The attacks were conducted by Al-Qaeda, acting in accord with the 1998 fatwa issued against the US and its allies by persons under the command of bin Laden, al-Zawahiri, and others. Evidence points to suicide squads led by Al-Qaeda military commander Mohamed Atta as the culprits of the attacks, with bin Laden, Ayman al-Zawahiri, Khalid Sheikh Mohammed, and Hambali as the key planners and part of the political and military command.

Messages issued by bin Laden after September 11, 2001, praised the attacks, and explained their motivation while denying any involvement. Bin Laden legitimized the attacks by identifying grievances felt by both mainstream and Islamist Muslims, such as the general perception that the US was actively oppressing Muslims.

Bin Laden asserted that America was massacring Muslims in "Palestine, Chechnya, Kashmir and Iraq" and Muslims should retain the "right to attack in reprisal". He also claimed the 9/11 attacks were not targeted at people, but "America's icons of military and economic power", despite the fact he planned to attack in the morning when most of the people in the intended targets were present and thus generating the maximum number of human casualties.

Evidence later came to light that the original targets for the attack may have been nuclear power stations on the US East Coast. The targets were later altered by Al-Qaeda, as it was feared that such an attack "might get out of hand".

Designation as a terrorist group 
Al-Qaeda is deemed a designated terrorist group by the following countries and international organizations:

 
 
 
 
 
 
 
 
 
 
 
 
 
 
 
 
 
 
 
 
 
 
 
 
 
 
 
 
 
  designated Al-Qaeda's Turkish branch
 
 
  United Nations Security Council

War on terror 

In the immediate aftermath of the 9/11 attacks, the US government responded, and began to prepare its armed forces to overthrow the Taliban, which it believed was harboring Al-Qaeda. The US offered Taliban leader Mullah Omar a chance to surrender bin Laden and his top associates. The first forces to be inserted into Afghanistan were paramilitary officers from the CIA's elite Special Activities Division (SAD).

The Taliban offered to turn over bin Laden to a neutral country for trial if the US would provide evidence of bin Laden's complicity in the attacks. US President George W. Bush responded by saying: "We know he's guilty. Turn him over", and British Prime Minister Tony Blair warned the Taliban regime: "Surrender bin Laden, or surrender power."

Soon thereafter the US and its allies invaded Afghanistan, and together with the Afghan Northern Alliance removed the Taliban government as part of the war in Afghanistan. As a result of the US special forces and air support for the Northern Alliance ground forces, a number of Taliban and Al-Qaeda training camps were destroyed, and much of the operating structure of Al-Qaeda is believed to have been disrupted. After being driven from their key positions in the Tora Bora area of Afghanistan, many Al-Qaeda fighters tried to regroup in the rugged Gardez region of the nation.

By early 2002, Al-Qaeda had been dealt a serious blow to its operational capacity, and the Afghan invasion appeared to be a success. Nevertheless, a significant Taliban insurgency remained in Afghanistan.

Debate continued regarding the nature of Al-Qaeda's role in the 9/11 attacks. The US State Department released a videotape showing bin Laden speaking with a small group of associates somewhere in Afghanistan shortly before the Taliban was removed from power. Although its authenticity has been questioned by a couple of people, the tape definitively implicates bin Laden and Al-Qaeda in the September 11 attacks. The tape was aired on many television channels, with an accompanying English translation provided by the US Defense Department.

In September 2004, the 9/11 Commission officially concluded that the attacks were conceived and implemented by Al-Qaeda operatives. In October 2004, bin Laden appeared to claim responsibility for the attacks in a videotape released through Al Jazeera, saying he was inspired by Israeli attacks on high-rises in the 1982 invasion of Lebanon: "As I looked at those demolished towers in Lebanon, it entered my mind that we should punish the oppressor in kind and that we should destroy towers in America in order that they taste some of what we tasted and so that they be deterred from killing our women and children."

By the end of 2004, the US government proclaimed that two-thirds of the most senior Al-Qaeda figures from 2001 had been captured and interrogated by the CIA: Abu Zubaydah, Ramzi bin al-Shibh and Abd al-Rahim al-Nashiri in 2002; Khalid Sheikh Mohammed in 2003; and Saif al Islam el Masry in 2004. Mohammed Atef and several others were killed. The West was criticized for not being able to handle Al-Qaida despite a decade of the war.

Activities

Africa 

Al-Qaeda involvement in Africa has included a number of bombing attacks in North Africa, while supporting parties in civil wars in Eritrea and Somalia. From 1991 to 1996, bin Laden and other Al-Qaeda leaders were based in Sudan.

Islamist rebels in the Sahara calling themselves Al-Qaeda in the Islamic Maghreb have stepped up their violence in recent years. French officials say the rebels have no real links to the Al-Qaeda leadership, but this has been disputed. It seems likely that bin Laden approved the group's name in late 2006, and the rebels "took on the al Qaeda franchise label", almost a year before the violence began to escalate.

In Mali, the Ansar Dine faction was also reported as an ally of Al-Qaeda in 2013. The Ansar al Dine faction aligned themselves with the AQIM.

In 2011, Al-Qaeda's North African wing condemned Libyan leader Muammar Gaddafi and declared support for the Anti-Gaddafi rebels.

Following the Libyan Civil War, the removal of Gaddafi and the ensuing period of post-civil war violence in Libya, various Islamist militant groups affiliated with Al-Qaeda were able to expand their operations in the region. The 2012 Benghazi attack, which resulted in the death of US Ambassador J. Christopher Stevens and three other Americans, is suspected of having been carried out by various Jihadist networks, such as Al-Qaeda in the Islamic Maghreb, Ansar al-Sharia and several other Al-Qaeda affiliated groups. The capture of Nazih Abdul-Hamed al-Ruqai, a senior Al-Qaeda operative wanted by the United States for his involvement in the 1998 United States embassy bombings, on October 5, 2013, by US Navy Seals, FBI and CIA agents illustrates the importance the US and other Western allies have placed on North Africa.

Europe 

Prior to the September 11 attacks, Al-Qaeda was present in Bosnia and Herzegovina, and its members were mostly veterans of the El Mudžahid detachment of the Bosnian Muslim Army of the Republic of Bosnia and Herzegovina. Three Al-Qaeda operatives carried out the Mostar car bombing in 1997. The operatives were closely linked to and financed by the Saudi High Commission for Relief of Bosnia and Herzegovina founded by then-prince King Salman of Saudi Arabia.

Before the 9/11 attacks and the US invasion of Afghanistan, westerners who had been recruits at Al-Qaeda training camps were sought after by Al-Qaeda's military wing. Language skills and knowledge of Western culture were generally found among recruits from Europe, such was the case with Mohamed Atta, an Egyptian national studying in Germany at the time of his training, and other members of the Hamburg Cell. Osama bin Laden and Mohammed Atef would later designate Atta as the ringleader of the 9/11 hijackers. Following the attacks, Western intelligence agencies determined that Al-Qaeda cells operating in Europe had aided the hijackers with financing and communications with the central leadership based in Afghanistan.

In 2003, Islamists carried out a series of bombings in Istanbul killing fifty-seven people and injuring seven hundred. Seventy-four people were charged by the Turkish authorities. Some had previously met bin Laden, and though they specifically declined to pledge allegiance to Al-Qaeda they asked for its blessing and help.

In 2009, three Londoners, Tanvir Hussain, Assad Sarwar and Ahmed Abdullah Ali, were convicted of conspiring to detonate bombs disguised as soft drinks on seven airplanes bound for Canada and the US The MI5 investigation regarding the plot involved more than a year of surveillance work conducted by over two hundred officers. British and US officials said the plotunlike many similar homegrown European Islamic militant plotswas directly linked to Al-Qaeda and guided by senior Al-Qaeda members in Pakistan.

In 2012, Russian Intelligence indicated that Al-Qaeda had given a call for "forest jihad" and has been starting massive forest fires as part of a strategy of "thousand cuts".

Arab world 

Following Yemeni unification in 1990, Wahhabi networks began moving missionaries into the country. Although it is unlikely bin Laden or Saudi Al-Qaeda were directly involved, the personal connections they made would be established over the next decade and used in the USS Cole bombing. Concerns grew over al-Qaeda's group in Yemen.

In Iraq, al-Qaeda forces loosely associated with the leadership were embedded in the Jama'at al-Tawhid wal-Jihad group commanded by Abu Musab al-Zarqawi. Specializing in suicide operations, they have been a "key driver" of the Sunni insurgency. Although they played a small part in the overall insurgency, between 30% and 42% of all suicide bombings which took place in the early years were claimed by Zarqawi's group. Reports have indicated that oversights such as the failure to control access to the Qa'qaa munitions factory in Yusufiyah have allowed large quantities of munitions to fall into the hands of al-Qaida. In November 2010, the militant group Islamic State of Iraq, which is linked to al-Qaeda in Iraq, threatened to "exterminate all Iraqi Christians".

Al-Qaeda did not begin training Palestinians until the late 1990s. Large groups such as Hamas and Palestinian Islamic Jihad have rejected an alliance with al-Qaeda, fearing that al-Qaeda will co-opt their cells. This may have changed recently. The Israeli security and intelligence services believe al-Qaeda has managed to infiltrate operatives from the Occupied Territories into Israel, and is waiting for an opportunity to attack.

, Saudi Arabia, Qatar and Turkey are openly supporting the Army of Conquest, an umbrella rebel group fighting in the Syrian Civil War against the Syrian government that reportedly includes an al-Qaeda linked al-Nusra Front and another Salafi coalition known as Ahrar al-Sham.

Kashmir 

Bin Laden and Ayman al-Zawahiri consider India to be a part of an alleged Crusader-Zionist-Hindu conspiracy against the Islamic world. According to a 2005 report by the Congressional Research Service, bin Laden was involved in training militants for Jihad in Kashmir while living in Sudan in the early 1990s. By 2001, Kashmiri militant group Harkat-ul-Mujahideen had become a part of the al-Qaeda coalition. According to the United Nations High Commissioner for Refugees (UNHCR), al-Qaeda was thought to have established bases in Pakistan administered Kashmir (in Azad Kashmir, and to some extent in Gilgit–Baltistan) during the 1999 Kargil War and continued to operate there with tacit approval of Pakistan's Intelligence services.

Many of the militants active in Kashmir were trained in the same madrasahs as Taliban and Al-Qaeda. Fazlur Rehman Khalil of Kashmiri militant group Harkat-ul-Mujahideen was a signatory of al-Qaeda's 1998 declaration of Jihad against America and its allies. In a 'Letter to American People' (2002), bin Laden wrote that one of the reasons he was fighting America was because of its support to India on the Kashmir issue. In November 2001, Kathmandu airport went on high alert after threats that bin Laden planned to hijack a plane and crash it into a target in New Delhi. In 2002, US Secretary of Defense Donald Rumsfeld, on a trip to Delhi, suggested that Al-Qaeda was active in Kashmir though he did not have any evidence. Rumsfeld proposed hi-tech ground sensors along the Line of Control to prevent militants from infiltrating into Indian-administered Kashmir.
An investigation in 2002 found evidence that al-Qaeda and its affiliates were prospering in Pakistan-administered Kashmir with tacit approval of Pakistan's Inter-Services Intelligence. In 2002, a special team of Special Air Service and Delta Force was sent into Indian-Administered Kashmir to hunt for bin Laden after receiving reports that he was being sheltered by Kashmiri militant group Harkat-ul-Mujahideen, which had been responsible for kidnapping western tourists in Kashmir in 1995. Britain's highest-ranking al-Qaeda operative Rangzieb Ahmed had previously fought in Kashmir with the group Harkat-ul-Mujahideen and spent time in Indian prison after being captured in Kashmir.

US officials believe al-Qaeda was helping organize attacks in Kashmir in order to provoke conflict between India and Pakistan. Their strategy was to force Pakistan to move its troops to the border with India, thereby relieving pressure on al-Qaeda elements hiding in northwestern Pakistan. In 2006 al-Qaeda claimed they had established a wing in Kashmir. However Indian Army General H. S. Panag argued that the army had ruled out the presence of al-Qaeda in Indian-administered Jammu and Kashmir. Panag also said al-Qaeda had strong ties with Kashmiri militant groups Lashkar-e-Taiba and Jaish-e-Mohammed based in Pakistan. It has been noted that Waziristan has become a battlefield for Kashmiri militants fighting NATO in support of al-Qaeda and Taliban. Dhiren Barot, who wrote the Army of Madinah in Kashmir and was an al-Qaeda operative convicted for involvement in the 2004 financial buildings plot, had received training in weapons and explosives at a militant training camp in Kashmir.

Maulana Masood Azhar, the founder of Kashmiri group Jaish-e-Mohammed, is believed to have met bin Laden several times and received funding from him. In 2002, Jaish-e-Mohammed organized the kidnapping and murder of Daniel Pearl in an operation run in conjunction with al-Qaeda and funded by bin Laden. According to American counter-terrorism expert Bruce Riedel, al-Qaeda and Taliban were closely involved in the 1999 hijacking of Indian Airlines Flight 814 to Kandahar which led to the release of Maulana Masood Azhar and Ahmed Omar Saeed Sheikh from an Indian prison. This hijacking, Riedel said, was rightly described by then Indian Foreign Minister Jaswant Singh as a 'dress rehearsal' for September 11 attacks. Bin Laden personally welcomed Azhar and threw a lavish party in his honor after his release. Ahmed Omar Saeed Sheikh, who had been in prison for his role in the 1994 kidnappings of Western tourists in India, went on to murder Daniel Pearl and was sentenced to death in Pakistan. Al-Qaeda operative Rashid Rauf, who was one of the accused in 2006 transatlantic aircraft plot, was related to Maulana Masood Azhar by marriage.

Lashkar-e-Taiba, a Kashmiri militant group which is thought to be behind 2008 Mumbai attacks, is also known to have strong ties to senior al-Qaeda leaders living in Pakistan. In late 2002, top Al-Qaeda operative Abu Zubaydah was arrested while being sheltered by Lashkar-e-Taiba in a safe house in Faisalabad. The FBI believes al-Qaeda and Lashkar have been 'intertwined' for a long time while the CIA has said that al-Qaeda funds Lashkar-e-Taiba. Jean-Louis Bruguière told Reuters in 2009 that "Lashkar-e-Taiba is no longer a Pakistani movement with only a Kashmir political or military agenda. Lashkar-e-Taiba is a member of al-Qaeda."

In a video released in 2008, American-born senior al-Qaeda operative Adam Yahiye Gadahn said that "victory in Kashmir has been delayed for years; it is the liberation of the jihad there from this interference which, Allah willing, will be the first step towards victory over the Hindu occupiers of that Islam land."

In September 2009, a US drone strike reportedly killed Ilyas Kashmiri who was the chief of Harkat-ul-Jihad al-Islami, a Kashmiri militant group associated with al-Qaeda. Kashmiri was described by Bruce Riedel as a 'prominent' Al-Qaeda member while others have described him as head of military operations for al-Qaeda. Kashmiri was also charged by the US in a plot against Jyllands-Posten, the Danish newspaper which was at the center of Jyllands-Posten Muhammad cartoons controversy. US officials also believe that Kashmiri was involved in the Camp Chapman attack against the CIA. In January 2010, Indian authorities notified Britain of an al-Qaeda plot to hijack an Indian airlines or Air India plane and crash it into a British city. This information was uncovered from interrogation of Amjad Khwaja, an operative of Harkat-ul-Jihad al-Islami, who had been arrested in India.

In January 2010, US Defense secretary Robert Gates, while on a visit to Pakistan, said that al-Qaeda was seeking to destabilize the region and planning to provoke a nuclear war between India and Pakistan.

Internet 
Al-Qaeda and its successors have migrated online to escape detection in an atmosphere of increased international vigilance. The group's use of the Internet has grown more sophisticated, with online activities that include financing, recruitment, networking, mobilization, publicity, and information dissemination, gathering and sharing.

Abu Ayyub al-Masri's al-Qaeda movement in Iraq regularly releases short videos glorifying the activity of jihadist suicide bombers. In addition, both before and after the death of Abu Musab al-Zarqawi (the former leader of al-Qaeda in Iraq), the umbrella organization to which Al-Qaeda in Iraq belongs, the Mujahideen Shura Council, has a regular presence on the Web.

The range of multimedia content includes guerrilla training clips, stills of victims about to be murdered, testimonials of suicide bombers, and videos that show participation in jihad through stylized portraits of mosques and musical scores. A website associated with Al-Qaeda posted a video of captured American entrepreneur Nick Berg being decapitated in Iraq. Other decapitation videos and pictures, including those of Paul Johnson, Kim Sun-il, and Daniel Pearl, were first posted on jihadist websites.

In December 2004 an audio message claiming to be from bin Laden was posted directly to a website, rather than sending a copy to al Jazeera as he had done in the past. Al-Qaeda turned to the Internet for release of its videos in order to be certain they would be available unedited, rather than risk the possibility of al Jazeera editing out anything critical of the Saudi royal family.

Alneda.com and Jehad.net were perhaps the most significant al-Qaeda websites. Alneda was initially taken down by American Jon Messner, but the operators resisted by shifting the site to various servers and strategically shifting content.

The US government charged a British information technology specialist, Babar Ahmad, with terrorist offences related to his operating a network of English-language al-Qaeda websites, such as Azzam.com. He was convicted and sentenced to  years in prison.

Online communications 
In 2007, al-Qaeda released Mujahedeen Secrets, encryption software used for online and cellular communications. A later version, Mujahideen Secrets 2, was released in 2008.

Aviation network 
al-Qaeda is believed to be operating a clandestine aviation network including "several Boeing 727 aircraft", turboprops and executive jets, according to a 2010 Reuters story. Based on a US Department of Homeland Security report, the story said al-Qaeda is possibly using aircraft to transport drugs and weapons from South America to various unstable countries in West Africa. A Boeing 727 can carry up to ten tons of cargo. The drugs eventually are smuggled to Europe for distribution and sale, and the weapons are used in conflicts in Africa and possibly elsewhere. Gunmen with links to al-Qaeda have been increasingly kidnapping Europeans for ransom. The profits from the drug and weapon sales, and kidnappings can, in turn, fund more militant activities.

Involvement in military conflicts 

The following is a list of military conflicts in which al-Qaeda and its direct affiliates have taken part militarily.

Alleged CIA involvement 

Experts debate the notion that al-Qaeda attacks were an indirect result from the American CIA's Operation Cyclone program to help the Afghan mujahideen. Robin Cook, British Foreign Secretary from 1997 to 2001, has written that al-Qaeda and bin Laden were "a product of a monumental miscalculation by western security agencies", and that "Al-Qaida, literally 'the database', was originally the computer file of the thousands of mujahideen who were recruited and trained with help from the CIA to defeat the Russians."

Munir Akram, Permanent Representative of Pakistan to the United Nations from 2002 to 2008, wrote in a letter published in The New York Times on January 19, 2008:

CNN journalist Peter Bergen, Pakistani ISI Brigadier Mohammad Yousaf, and CIA operatives involved in the Afghan program, such as Vincent Cannistraro, deny that the CIA or other American officials had contact with the foreign mujahideen or bin Laden, or that they armed, trained, coached or indoctrinated them. In his 2004 book Ghost Wars, Steve Coll writes that the CIA had contemplated providing direct support to the foreign mujahideen, but that the idea never moved beyond discussions.

Bergen and others argue that there was no need to recruit foreigners unfamiliar with the local language, customs or lay of the land since there were a quarter of a million local Afghans willing to fight. Bergen further argues that foreign mujahideen had no need for American funds since they received several million dollars per year from internal sources. Lastly, he argues that Americans could not have trained the foreign mujahideen because Pakistani officials would not allow more than a handful of them to operate in Pakistan and none in Afghanistan, and the Afghan Arabs were almost invariably militant Islamists reflexively hostile to Westerners whether or not the Westerners were helping the Muslim Afghans.

According to Bergen, who conducted the first television interview with bin Laden in 1997: the idea that "the CIA funded bin Laden or trained bin Laden... [is] a folk myth. There's no evidence of this... Bin Laden had his own money, he was anti-American and he was operating secretly and independently... The real story here is the CIA didn't really have a clue about who this guy was until 1996 when they set up a unit to really start tracking him."

Jason Burke also wrote:

Broader influence 
Anders Behring Breivik, the perpetrator of the 2011 Norway attacks, was inspired by al-Qaeda, calling it "the most successful revolutionary movement in the world." While admitting different aims, he sought to "create a European version of Al-Qaida."

The appropriate response to offshoots is a subject of debate. A journalist reported in 2012 that a senior US military planner had asked: "Should we resort to drones and Special Operations raids every time some group raises the black banner of al Qaeda? How long can we continue to chase offshoots of offshoots around the world?"

Criticism 

Islamic extremism dates back to the early history of Islam with the emergence of the Kharijites in the 7th century CE. From their essentially political position, the Kharijites developed extreme doctrines that set them apart from both mainstream Sunni and Shiʿa Muslims. The original schism between Kharijites, Sunnis, and Shiʿas among Muslims was disputed over the political and religious succession to the guidance of the Muslim community (Ummah) after the death of the Islamic prophet Muhammad. Shiʿas believe Ali ibn Abi Talib is the true successor to Muhammad, while Sunnis consider Abu Bakr to hold that position. The Kharijites broke away from both the Shiʿas and the Sunnis during the First Fitna (the first Islamic Civil War); they were particularly noted for adopting a radical approach to takfīr (excommunication), whereby they declared both Sunni and Shiʿa Muslims to be either infidels (kuffār) or false Muslims (munāfiḳūn), and therefore deemed them worthy of death for their perceived apostasy (ridda).

According to a number of sources, a "wave of revulsion" has been expressed against Al-Qaeda and its affiliates by "religious scholars, former fighters and militants" who are alarmed by Al-Qaeda's takfir and its killing of Muslims in Muslim countries, especially in Iraq.

Noman Benotman, a former militant member of the Libyan Islamic Fighting Group (LIFG), went public with an open letter of criticism to Ayman al-Zawahiri in November 2007, after persuading the imprisoned senior leaders of his former group to enter into peace negotiations with the Libyan regime. While Ayman al-Zawahiri announced the affiliation of the group with Al-Qaeda in November 2007, the Libyan government released 90 members of the group from prison several months after "they were said to have renounced violence."

In 2007, on the anniversary of the September 11 attacks, the Saudi sheikh Salman al-Ouda delivered a personal rebuke to bin Laden. Al-Ouda, a religious scholar and one of the fathers of the Sahwa, the fundamentalist awakening movement that swept through Saudi Arabia in the 1980s, is a widely respected critic of jihadism. Al-Ouda addressed Al-Qaeda's leader on television asking him:

According to Pew polls, support for Al-Qaeda had dropped in the Muslim world in the years before 2008. Support of suicide bombings in Indonesia, Lebanon, and Bangladesh, dropped by half or more in the last five years. In Saudi Arabia, only ten percent had a favorable view of Al-Qaeda, according to a December 2017 poll by Terror Free Tomorrow, a Washington-based think tank.

In 2007, the imprisoned Sayyed Imam Al-Sharif, an influential Afghan Arab, "ideological godfather of Al-Qaeda", and former supporter of takfir, withdrew his support from Al-Qaeda with a book Wathiqat Tarshid Al-'Aml Al-Jihadi fi Misr w'Al-'Alam.

Although once associated with Al-Qaeda, in September 2009 LIFG completed a new "code" for jihad, a 417-page religious document entitled "Corrective Studies". Given its credibility and the fact that several other prominent Jihadists in the Middle East have turned against Al-Qaeda, the LIFG's reversal may be an important step toward staunching Al-Qaeda's recruitment.

Other criticisms 
Bilal Abdul Kareem, an American journalist based in Syria created a documentary about al-Shabab, Al-Qaeda's affiliate in Somalia. The documentary included interviews with former members of the group who stated their reasons for leaving al-Shabab. The members made accusations of segregation, lack of religious awareness and internal corruption and favoritism. In response to Kareem, the Global Islamic Media Front condemned Kareem, called him a liar, and denied the accusations from the former fighters.

In mid-2014 after the Islamic State of Iraq and the Levant declared that they had restored the Caliphate, an audio statement was released by the then-spokesman of the group Abu Muhammad al-Adnani claiming that "the legality of all emirates, groups, states, and organizations, becomes null by the expansion of the Caliphate's authority." The speech included a religious refutation of Al-Qaeda for being too lenient regarding Shiites and their refusal to recognize the authority Abu Bakr al-Baghdadi, al-Adnani specifically noting: "It is not suitable for a state to give allegiance to an organization." He also recalled a past instance in which Osama bin Laden called on Al-Qaeda members and supporters to give allegiance to Abu Omar al-Baghdadi when the group was still solely operating in Iraq, as the Islamic State of Iraq, and condemned Ayman al-Zawahiri for not making this same claim for Abu Bakr al-Baghdadi. Zawahiri was encouraging factionalism and division between former allies of ISIL such as the al-Nusra Front.

See also 

 Al-Qaeda involvement in Asia
 Al Qaeda Network Exord
 Allegations of support system in Pakistan for Osama bin Laden
 Belligerents in the Syrian civil war
 Bin Laden Issue Station (former CIA unit for tracking bin Laden)
 Steven Emerson
 Fatawā of Osama bin Laden
 International propagation of Salafism and Wahhabism (by region)
 Iran – Alleged Al-Qaeda ties
 Islamic Military Counter Terrorism Coalition
 Operation Cannonball
 Psychological warfare
 Religious terrorism
 Takfir wal-Hijra
 Videos and audio recordings of Osama bin Laden
 Violent extremism

Publications 
 Al Qaeda Handbook
 Management of Savagery

References

Sources

Bibliography

Reviews

Government reports 

 
  Alt URL

External links

 
 Al-Qaeda in Oxford Islamic Studies Online
 Al-Qaeda, Counter Extremism Project profile
 17 de-classified documents captured during the Abbottabad raid and released to the Combating Terrorism Center
 
Media
 Peter Taylor. (2007). "War on the West". Age of Terror, No. 4, series 1. BBC.
 Investigating Al-Qaeda, BBC News
 
 "Al Qaeda's New Front" from PBS Frontline, January 2005
 
 
 

 
Anti-communist organizations
Anti-communist terrorism
Antisemitism in Pakistan
Antisemitism in the Arab world
Antisemitism in the Middle East
Anti-Shi'ism
Anti-Zionist organizations
Islam and antisemitism
Islamic fundamentalism in the United States
Islamic fundamentalism
Islam-related controversies
Organizations based in Asia designated as terrorist
Organisations designated as terrorist by Australia
Organizations designated as terrorist by Bahrain
Organizations designated as terrorist by Canada
Organisations designated as terrorist by India
Organizations designated as terrorist by China
Organisations designated as terrorist by Iran
Organizations designated as terrorist by Israel
Organisations designated as terrorist by Japan
Organizations designated as terrorist by Kyrgyzstan
Organisations designated as terrorist by Pakistan
Organisations designated as terrorist by the United Kingdom
Organizations designated as terrorist by Malaysia
Organizations designated as terrorist by Paraguay
Organizations designated as terrorist by Russia
Organizations designated as terrorist by Saudi Arabia
Organizations designated as terrorist by Turkey
Organizations designated as terrorist by the United Arab Emirates
Organizations designated as terrorist by the United States
Organizations established in 1988
Organizations that oppose LGBT rights
Pan-Islamism
Al-Qaeda
Salafi Jihadist groups
Sunni Islamist groups
Qutbist organisations
Violence against LGBT people
Violence against Shia Muslims